Portrait of a Young Englishman (Portrait of a Young Man with Grey Eyes) is a 1540–45 portrait by Titian, now held in the Palazzo Pitti. Its subject is unidentified, but may be Henry Howard, Ottavio Farnese or Ippolito Rominaldi.

References

1545 paintings
Young Englishman
Paintings in the collection of the Galleria Palatina
Young Englishman